"Roll Up" is a song by American rapper Wiz Khalifa. It was released as the second single from his third studio album, Rolling Papers; having been written by Wiz Khalifa, and Stargate.

The song peaked at number 13 on the Billboard Hot 100 and was certified double platinum  by the Recording Industry Association of America (RIAA).

American recording artist and model Cassie Ventura is featured on the official music video. The video was shot in Venice, Los Angeles at Venice Beach.

Live performances 
Khalifa performed a short version "Roll Up" followed by "Black and Yellow" at the 2011 MTV Woodie Awards in March 2011. He later performed the song on the Late Show with David Letterman on April 11, 2011 and on Jimmy Kimmel Live in May 2011. The song was part of his 49-minute set during the final day of the 2011 Coachella Valley Music and Arts Festival. He also sang it at Bumbershoot in September 2011.

Cover versions 
"Roll Up" was covered by Canadian indie band Walk off the Earth. The Ready Set recorded a cover of the song for the compilation album Punk Goes Pop 4.

Critical reception 
Billboard gave the song a positive review, writing: "While 'Roll Up' is a noticeable change from Wiz Khalifa's previous releases, the tune's laid-back emotional vibe is an appreciated left turn." Maura Johnston of Popdust described "Roll Up" as "a breezy romantic ode" and continued, saying "The sing-song chorus, in which Wiz promises to 'roll up' whenever his woman wants him, isn't great, and it may have a popularity hiccup among those people who can appreciate the song’s sentiment but who aren’t ready to listen to it when their significant others are around. But it’s pretty infectious." Less appreciative, Lewis Corner of Digital Spy gave the song a three-star rating out of five and commented: "it unfortunately lacks the knockout hooks that its predecessor ["Black and Yellow"] so effortlessly flaunted – sounding more like a Nelly cast-off circa 2002 than a modern-day hip-hop classic."

Chart performance
Roll Up debuted at number 48 on the US Billboard Hot 100, and peaked at number thirteen, becoming Khalifa's fifth-highest charting single as a solo artist behind "See You Again", "Black and Yellow", "No Sleep", and "Young, Wild & Free". The single was eventually certified double platinum by the Recording Industry Association of America (RIAA) for sales of over two million copies in the United States.

Track listing 
Digital download
 "Roll Up" – 3:47

Charts

Weekly charts

Year-end charts

Certifications

Release history

References

External links

2011 singles
Wiz Khalifa songs
Pop-rap songs
Song recordings produced by Stargate (record producers)
Songs written by Mikkel Storleer Eriksen
Songs written by Tor Erik Hermansen
Rostrum Records singles
Atlantic Records singles